Adrian Michael Morris (January 12, 1907 – November 30, 1941) was an American actor of stage and film, and a younger brother of Chester Morris.

As a child, Morris performed with his family in a vaudeville act. In his short  career as a Hollywood character actor, he appeared in over 70 films, including 
Dirigible (1931), 
Me and My Gal (1932), 
Bureau of Missing Persons (1933), 
The Big Shakedown (1934), 
The Fighting Marines (1935), 
The Petrified Forest (1936), 
There Goes the Groom (1937),
Angels with Dirty Faces (1938), 
Gone With the Wind (1939), 
The Grapes of Wrath (1940), 
and Blood and Sand (1941).

Early life and family 
Adrian Morris was born in Mount Vernon, New York, one of four surviving children of Broadway stage actor William Morris and stage comedic actress Etta Hawkins. His siblings were screenwriter-actor Gordon Morris (1898–1940), actor Chester Morris (1901–1970), and actress Wilhelmina Morris (1902–1971). Another brother, Lloyd Morris (1892–1902), had died young.

As a six-year-old, Morris served as assistant to Chester who, by the time he was twelve, had developed an interest in performing magic tricks which often went wrong, to everyone's amusement. Both brothers also attended the same dancing school. In 1923, the whole Morris family teamed up to perform William Morris' original sketch called All the Horrors of Home, which premiered at the Palace Theatre, New York, then on the Keith-Orpheum vaudeville circuit for two years, including Proctor's Theatre, Mount Vernon, New York, and culminating in Los Angeles in 1925.

In 1929, Morris wrote—under the pseudonym of "Adrian O'Hara"—a column in the December copy of Talking Picture Magazine entitled "I Know Chester Morris", in which he praised his elder brother as a talented man excelling in music, painting and acting. Their brotherly friendship lasted for their entire lives.

Career 
Adrian Morris moved to Hollywood in 1929. In 1931, he made his first, uncredited appearance in Frank Capra's aviation epic Dirigible by Columbia, and had a supporting role in Howard Hughes' The Age for Love, directed by Frank Lloyd. Two more uncredited roles at Columbia followed the same year: the Officer in Arizona starring John Wayne, and Snooper the Henchman in The Pagan Lady starring Evelyn Brent, before other companies began to award him more visible parts with screen billing. After The Age for Love (1931), released by United Artists, he was cast as Allen by Raoul Walsh for Fox's romantic comedy-drama Me and My Gal (1932), with Spencer Tracy and Joan Bennett.

On February 26, 1932, Morris married stage actress Eva Virginia Shipley in Berverly Hills, and continued working regularly, playing uncredited or supporting parts in major films released in 1933, such as Warner Bros.' The Little Giant, with Edward G. Robinson; The Mayor of Hell with James Cagney; Bureau of Missing Persons, with Bette Davis, Pat O'Brien and Glenda Farrell; and the powerful Depression drama Wild Boys of the Road, with Frankie Darro. The same year, he also played the uncredited role of a crap shooter in Universal's King for a Night, directed by Kurt Neumann, and starring his brother Chester in the lead role.

From 1934 until the end of 1939, Morris appeared in a total of 45 major studio features, many of them top commercial and artistic successes made by the industry's greatest directors. At Warner Bros., he supported James Cagney and Ann Dvorak in G Men (1935); Paul Muni and Ann Dvorak again in Dr. Socrates (1935); Bette Davis, Leslie Howard, and Humphrey Bogart in The Petrified Forest (1936); and James Cagney, Pat O'Brien and Humphrey Bogart in Angels with Dirty Faces (1938). Morris was also a sidekick for Grant Withers in two serials: The Fighting Marines (1935) for Mascot Pictures and Radio Patrol (1937) for Universal Pictures.

Paramount Pictures cast him with W. C. Fields and Rochelle Hudson in Poppy (1936); Mae West, Edmund Lowe and Louis Armstrong in Every Day's a Holiday (1937); Sylvia Sidney and George Raft in You and Me (1938); Ronald Colman and Basil Rathbone in If I Were King (1938); and Barbara Stanwyck and Joel McCrea in Union Pacific (1939). At MGM, he appeared as support to Wallace Beery and Robert Young in West Point of the Air (1935); Paul Lukas and Madge Evans in Age of Indiscretion (1935); Robert Young and Madge Evans in Calm Yourself (1935); and Walter Pidgeon and Rita Johnson in 6,000 Enemies (1939).

RKO Radio cast him with Harry Carey and Hoot Gibson in Powdersmoke Range (1935), Paul Muni and Miriam Hopkins in The Woman I Love, and Ann Sothern and Burgess Meredith in There Goes the Groom (1937). At 20th Century Fox, he played a policeman in Mr. Moto's Gamble (1938), an entry in the Japanese detective series with a cast including Peter Lorre, Keye Luke and Lynn Bari. In 1939, he also appeared with Warner Baxter and Lynn Bari in The Return of the Cisco Kid; with Tyrone Power, Alice Faye and Al Jolson in Rose of Washington Square; and with Cesar Romero and Marjorie Weaver in The Cisco Kid and the Lady, all for 20th Century Fox.

In many of these films, he performed as a character actor, often uncredited or, later in his career, as "Michael Morris". His roles were usually of small-time hoodlum or rough-neck types, cowboys, policemen, and many other characters, such as the carpetbagger in Gone With the Wind (1939) and the hiring agent in The Grapes of Wrath (1940). For Nat Levine's Mascot Pictures, Morris played more  prominent roles: Deputy Abner in the comic mystery One Frightened Night, and Sergeant Mack McGowan in the serial The Fighting Marines, both in 1935. In Wall Street Cowboy for Republic Pictures (1939), he appeared as Big Joe Gillespie opposite B-Western favorites Roy Rogers, George 'Gabby' Hayes and Raymond Hatton.

Death 
He was scheduled to begin playing in Chester's film I'll Be Back in a Flash—released as I Live on Danger (1942)—when he died suddenly of a brain haemorrhage on November 30, 1941, in Los Angeles. His final film, Fly-by-Night, was released posthumously on January 19, 1942.

Complete filmography

References

External links

Adrian Morris at Rotten Tomatoes
Adrian Morris at Classic Movie Hub

1907 births
1941 deaths
American male film actors
American male stage actors
20th-century American male actors
Male actors from New York City